Hilda Ward (1878–1950) American Expressionist painter and author. She studied with Robert Henri and exhibited in the 1910 New York Exhibition of Independent Artists and the 1913 Armory Show. Ward also wrote A Girl and the Motor.

Early life
Hilda Ward was born in Annapolis, Maryland, the daughter of Rear Admiral Aaron Ward.

Ward studied in New York City with Robert Henri. Her friends included William Glackens and John French Sloan.

Career

Ward exhibited at the 1910 New York Exhibition of Independent Artists, showing The Tenant's Dog.  Ward was also one of the artists who exhibited at the Armory Show of 1913.  The show included two of her pieces, The Hound and The Kennels, one of which was a pastel and the other a drawing.

Ward was the author of a 1908 book entitled A Girl and the Motor, which chronicled her experiences as a woman driver and mechanic during the early years of the Automobile Age. She was, upon occasion, to include automobiles in the paintings.

Personal life
Ward lived in Roslyn, Long Island. She died in 1950.

References

1878 births
1950 deaths
American women painters
19th-century American painters
20th-century American painters
Students of Robert Henri
20th-century American women artists
19th-century American women artists